is a Japanese word meaning "unreasonableness; impossible; beyond one's power; too difficult; by force; perforce; forcibly; compulsorily; excessiveness; immoderation", and is a key concept in the Toyota Production System (TPS) as one of the three types of waste (muda, mura, muri).

A direct example of Muri is asking workers to stay focused for a period exceeding 8 hrs. a day or expecting a machine to produce more than it can in a given time.

Some of the most common reasons why production systems experience overburdening:

 Unmeasured system capacity, despite assigning production expectations in set numbers
 A suboptimal technical condition of used machines, or untrained staff
 Poor communication across the team and manager

Avoidance of muri in Toyota manufacturing
Muri is one of three types of waste (muda, mura, muri) identified in the Toyota Production System. Waste reduction is an effective way to increase profitability.

Muri can be avoided through standardized work.  To achieve this a standard condition or output must be defined to assure effective judgment of quality.  Then every process and function must be reduced to its simplest elements for examination and later recombination.
The process must then be standardized to achieve the defined condition. This is done by taking simple work elements and combining them, one-by-one into standardized work sequences.  In manufacturing, this includes:
 Work flow, or logical directions to be taken,
 Repeatable process steps and machine processes, or rational methods to get there, and
 Takt time (combined with production/demand leveling to provide for reasonable lengths of time and endurance allowed for a process e.g. if the takt is 10 minutes while there is no realistic way for a process to do its work in less than 10 minutes, Muri is the natural outcome).

When everyone knows the standard condition, and the standardized work sequences, the results observed include:
 Heightened employee morale (due to close examination of ergonomics and safety)
 Higher quality
 Improved productivity
 Reduced costs

Implementation 

In fact the big contribution of Henry Ford and his manufacturing techniques was the reduction of Muri and not so much the production line itself. In order for the production line to function each station on the line had to achieve standard work because the next station was only equipped to work on standard condition components.

The Ford production line approximates to an implementation of Takt time which gives enough time to perform the standard work.

References

Japanese business terms
Lean manufacturing